Hussein S. M. Zedan (1 July 1953 – 23 February 2019) was a computer scientist of Egyptian descent, mainly based in the United Kingdom.

Hussein Zedan was born in 1953. He received his PhD degree in 1981 at the University of Bristol, studying under John Derwent Pryce and Hubert Schwetlick for a thesis entitled Modified Rosenbrock-Wanner methods for solving systems of stiff ordinary differential equations.

Zedan was an academic in the Department of Computer Science at the University of York. Prof. Zedan then headed the Software Technology Research Laboratory (STRL) as Technical Director at De Montfort University. He was also Head of Computing Research. Later STRL was headed by Zedan's PhD student and subsequently colleague François Siewe. Zedan was subsequently appointed Assistant Vice-President of Academic Affairs and Development at the Applied Science University in Manama, Bahrain, until 2017.

Hussein Zedan died on 23 February 2019. He was married with two daughters.

Selected publications
 
 
 
 
 
 
 
 
 
 
 
  – republished as:

References

External links
 Hussein Zedan on ResearchGate
 Hussein Zedan on Academia.edu
 Hussein Zedan on LinkedIn
 Hussein Zedan on DBLP
 Hussein Zedan on IEEE Xplore
 
 

1953 births
2019 deaths
Alumni of the University of Bristol
Egyptian computer scientists
Egyptian expatriates in England
British computer scientists
Formal methods people
Software engineering researchers
Academics of the University of York
Academics of De Montfort University